Melanesian is the adjectival form of Melanesia. It may refer to:

 Melanesians
 Melanesian mythology
 Melanesian languages

See also
 

Language and nationality disambiguation pages